Gifted Child Today is a quarterly peer-reviewed academic journal that covers research on teaching and parenting gifted and talented children. The editor-in-chief is Susan Johnsen (Baylor University). It was established in 1978 and is currently published by SAGE Publications.

Abstracting and indexing 
Gifted Child Today is abstracted and indexed in:
 Academic OneFile
 Education Abstracts
 Education Research Complete
 ERIC - Education Resources Information Center
 Professional Development Collection
 ProQuest
 TOC Premier
 Zetoc

External links 
 

English-language journals
Gifted education
Publications established in 1978
Quarterly journals
SAGE Publishing academic journals
Special education journals